Nivedhithaa Sathish is an Indian actress who works predominantly in the Tamil and Telugu film industries. She starred in Suzhal: The Vortex and played a troubled killer Anya in Anya's Tutorial.

Career
Nivedhithaa made her acting debut in 2017, when she appeared in the Tamil film Magalir Mattum as the younger version of Saranya Ponvannan's character. She made her Telugu debut with Hello and played Kalyani Priyadarshan's friend in the film. 

In 2019, she played one of the leads in the segment Kakka Kadi in the anthology film Sillu Karupatti, and in the following year she had a lead role in Sethum Aayiram Pon, as a young woman who visits her grandmother.  

In 2022, she made her Telugu debut as lead actress in the role as Anya in the horror television series Anya's Tutorial, produced by Arka Media and directed by Pallavi Gangireddy. She starred alongside popular actress Regina Cassandra.

Filmography

References

External links 
 

Actresses in Tamil cinema
Actresses in Telugu cinema
Living people
1998 births